R v Basi is a landmark decision by Supreme Court of Canada where the Court weighed the rights of the defendant versus the privileges of an informant in an important trial into alleged government corruption.

Background

Three employees of the provincial government of British Columbia were charged with corruption and breach of trust following the BC Legislature Raids.

On December 6, 2007, British Columbia Supreme Court Justice Elizabeth Bennett ruled  against a pre-trial Crown request to exclude defence lawyers from an in-camera hearing on information involving a police informant.

British Columbia Court of Appeal

The British Columbia Court of Appeal split 2-1 in upholding the trial judge's decision. This allowed the defendants' lawyers to be present during a hearing regarding disclosure of documents to the defence that involved a police informant.

Reasons of the Court

The Supreme Court of Canada heard the appeal on April 22, 2009. Intervenors were the Director of Public Prosecutions of Canada, Attorney General of Ontario, Canadian Association of Chiefs of Police and Criminal Lawyers’ Association (Ontario).

The unanimous judgment was written by Fish J.

The Court found that where a hearing is required to determine a claim of informer privilege, the hearing must be held ex parte, without the defendant or their counsel present, but only if it is required to keep the informer's identity confidential. The hearing should only be held ex parte as necessary.  Trial judges should adopt all reasonable measures to permit defence counsel to make meaningful submissions regarding what occurs in their absence.  Trial judges have broad discretion to craft appropriate procedures in this regard.

The Court went on to suggest various methods trial judges may adopt to limit the unfairness to a defendant.

See also

List of Supreme Court of Canada cases

References

External links

Canadian Charter of Rights and Freedoms case law
Supreme Court of Canada cases
Canadian criminal procedure case law
2009 in Canadian case law
Trials of political people
Corruption in Canada
British Columbia political scandals